Gaffney Residential Historic District national historic district located at Gaffney, Cherokee County, South Carolina. The district encompasses 111 contributing building in a primarily residential area of Gaffney. The majority of the buildings were built between about 1890 and about 1930, and consist of houses sited on large urban lots and oriented towards wide, tree-lined streets. Homes are generally of frame or brick construction with fine examples of the Queen Anne, Colonial Revival, Neoclassical, Victorian and Bungalow styles as well as traditional vernacular forms. Included in the district are homes of textile mill executives, merchants, and other professionals who lived in Gaffney during its boom period at the turn of the 20th century.

It was listed on the National Register of Historic Places in 1986.

References

Houses on the National Register of Historic Places in South Carolina
Historic districts on the National Register of Historic Places in South Carolina
Colonial Revival architecture in South Carolina
Neoclassical architecture in South Carolina
Houses in Cherokee County, South Carolina
National Register of Historic Places in Cherokee County, South Carolina
Gaffney, South Carolina